Woodside is a small housing area in the north of Dundee, Scotland. The area runs between Graham Street, Mains Loan and lengthwise to the Kingsway. The residential housing is mainly 1920s constructions with four homes to a block.

The area is within a walkable distance of the amenities of Clepington Road, however it is home to one corner shop, Graham St. News.

Xplore Dundee service the area with the  No. 21 - Woodside route, which runs Monday to Saturday, from 05:50 until 18:20. A Sunday service is provided by the redirected 18A - Kirkton.

References

Areas of Dundee